Arben Ahmetaj (born 28 June 1969 in Gjirokastër) is an Albanian politician who served as the Deputy Prime Minister of Albania from 2021 to 2022. Since 2013 previously has served in several important departments such as: Minister of Economic Development, Minister of Finance, as well as Minister of State for Reconstruction after the devastating earthquake in 2019 that occurred in the central area of the country.

Life and Political career 
Arben Ahmetaj was born in Gjirokastra on June 28, 1969. He completed his studies in English, specializing in American and English Literature, at the University of Tirana. He completed his master studies at the University of Kentucky from 1995 to 1997 in International Trade and Diplomacy, as well as his doctorate at the University of Bucharest with the topic "Energy Security, International Security". He successfully completed a scholarship to Georgetown University, Edmund Walsh School of Foreign Service, Washington D.C, and has been a participant in the Khokalis program at Harvard University. Arben Ahmetaj has worked as an external lecturer at the University of Tirana. In the years 1998–1999, he held the position of Chairman of the General Directorate of Taxation. In 2003-2004 he served as Deputy Minister in the Ministry of Energy and Industry, while in 2004-2005 as Deputy Minister in the Ministry of European Integration.

Notes

References 

1969 births
Living people
Politicians from Tirana 
Deputy Prime Ministers of Albania
Economy ministers of Albania
Finance ministers of Albania
Tourism ministers of Albania
Trade ministers of Albania
21st-century Albanian politicians
Socialist Party of Albania politicians
University of Kentucky alumni
Walsh School of Foreign Service alumni